As well as being a noun and a verb in its own right (""), Simper is also a surname.

Notable people with the surname Simper include:

 Amanda Simper (born 1968), Australian canoeist
 Caleb Simper (1856–1942), English composer and organist
 Lisbeth Simper (born 1978), Danish cyclist
 Nick Simper (born 1945) English bass guitarist, member of Deep Purple